L&P may refer to:

 Lemon & Paeroa, a New Zealand soft drink
 Letters and Papers of the Reign of Henry VIII
 Lea & Perrins, a UK food manufacturer